The White Rose Stakes was a flat horse race in Great Britain open to three-year-old horses. It was run at Ascot over a distance of 1 mile and 2 furlongs (2,012 metres), and it was scheduled to take place each year in April or May.

History
The event was originally held at Hurst Park. For a period it was open to horses aged three or older, and contested over 1 mile, 7 furlongs and 65 yards.

The White Rose Stakes was restricted to three-year-olds and cut to 1 mile and 2 furlongs in the early 1950s. It was transferred to Ascot in 1963. The present system of race grading was introduced in 1971, and the event was classed at Group 3 level.

The race continued with Group 3 status until the early 1980s. It was subsequently downgraded, and was last run in 1993. It was replaced by an open-age handicap, the White Rose Handicap, in 1994.

Records
Leading jockey since 1958 (5 wins):
 Lester Piggott – Samothraki (1962), Right Noble (1966), Light Fire (1969), Only a Wish (1970), Dukedom (1980)
 Willie Carson – Tierra Fuego (1976), Tully (1977), Milford (1979), Cut Above (1981), Alwuhush (1988)
 Steve Cauthen – Kirmann (1984), Vertige (1985), Mashkour (1986), Zalazl (1989), Perpendicular (1991)

Leading trainer since 1958 (4 wins):
 Dick Hern – Tepukei (1973), Tully (1977), Milford (1979), Cut Above (1981)
 Henry Cecil – Vertige (1985), Mashkour (1986), Zalazl (1989), Perpendicular (1991)

Winners since 1970

Earlier winners

 1939: Hunter's Moon
 1943: Harroway
 1946: Marsyas
 1947: Chanteur
 1948: Migoli
 1949: Black Tarquin
 1951: Colonist II
 1952: Hilltop
 1953: Ambiguity
 1954: Hypera
 1955: Marwari
 1956: Esperanza
 1958: Crystal Bay
 1959: Parthia
 1960: Tudor Period
 1961: Scatter
 1962: Samothraki
 1963: Fern
 1964: Beaufront
 1965: I Say
 1966: Right Noble
 1967: Great Society
 1968: Torpid
 1969: Light Fire

See also
 Horse racing in Great Britain
 List of British flat horse races

References

 Racing Post:
 galopp-sieger.de – White Rose Stakes.
 pedigreequery.com – White Rose Stakes – Ascot.

Flat races in Great Britain
Ascot Racecourse
Flat horse races for three-year-olds
Discontinued horse races
Recurring sporting events disestablished in 1993
Recurring sporting events established in 1939
1939 establishments in England
1993 disestablishments in England